Lamellitrochus is a genus of sea snails, marine gastropod mollusks in the family Solariellidae.

This is a taxon inquirendum: possible synonym of Zetela Finlay, 1926.

Species
Species within the genus Lamellitrochus include:
 Lamellitrochus bicoronatus Quinn, 1991
 Lamellitrochus cancapae (Vilvens & Swinnen, 2007)
 Lamellitrochus carinatus Quinn, 1991
 Lamellitrochus fenestratus Quinn, 1991
 Lamellitrochus filosus Quinn, 1991
 Lamellitrochus inceratus Quinn, 1991
 Lamellitrochus lamellosus (Verrill & S. Smith, 1880)
 Lamellitrochus pourtalesi (Clench & Aguayo, 1939)
 Lamellitrochus suavis Quinn, 1991

References

External links
 Quinn J.F. (1991). Lamellitrochus, a new genus of Solariellinae (Gastropoda: Trochidae), with descriptions of six new species from the western Atlantic. The Nautilus. 105(3): 81–91
 Williams S.T., Kano Y., Warén A. & Herbert D.G. (2020). Marrying molecules and morphology: first steps towards a reevaluation of solariellid genera (Gastropoda: Trochoidea) in the light of molecular phylogenetic studies. Journal of Molluscan Studies. 86(1): 1–26

 
Solariellidae